The Dean of Gloucester is the head (primus inter pares: first among equals) and chair of the chapter of canons - the ruling body of Gloucester Cathedral - and senior priest of the Diocese of Gloucester. The dean and chapter are based at Gloucester Cathedral. The cathedral is the mother church of the Diocese of Gloucester and seat of the Bishop of Gloucester.

List of deans

Early modern
1541–1565 William Jennings
1565–1569 John Man
1569–1570 Thomas Cooper
1571–1580 Lawrence Humphrey
1580–1585 Vacancy
1585–1594 Anthony Rudd
1594–1607 Griffith Lewis
1607–1609 Thomas Moreton
1609–1616 Richard Field
1616–1621 William Laud
1621–1624 Richard Senhouse
1624–1631 Thomas Winniffe
1631–1631 George Warburton
1631–1643 Accepted Frewen
1643–1671 William Brough
1671–1673 Thomas Vyner
1673–1681 Robert Frampton
1681–1685 Thomas Marshall
1685–1707 William Jane
1707–1720 Knightly Chetwood

1720–1723 John Waugh
1723–1729 John Frankland
1729–1730 Peter Allix
1730–1758 Daniel Newcombe
1758–1799 Josiah Tucker

Late modern
1800–1808 John Luxmoore
1808–1825 John Plumptre
1825–1862 Edward Rice
1862–1884 Henry Law
1885–1885 Edward Bickersteth
1885–?1887 Montagu Butler
1887–1917 Donald Spence (Spence-Jones after 1904)
1917–1938 Henry Gee
1938–1953 Harold Costley-White 
1953–1972 Seiriol Evans
1973–1982 Gilbert Thurlow
1983–1996 Kenneth Jennings
1997–2010 Nicholas Bury
2011–2022 Stephen Lake (became Bishop of Salisbury)
April 2023 onwards Andrew Zihni (announced)

Sources
:s:Page:Fasti ecclesiae Anglicanae Vol.1 body of work.djvu/485
:s:Page:Fasti ecclesiae Anglicanae Vol.1 body of work.djvu/486
:s:Page:Fasti ecclesiae Anglicanae Vol.1 body of work.djvu/487
http://www.british-history.ac.uk/report.aspx?compid=35315#s1

References

Deans of Gloucester
 
Dean of Gloucester